Tony Gould  is an Australian jazz musician, pianist, composer and educator.

Gould's many recordings and performances reveal his harmonic view of music and his love of music from both African-American and European jazz traditions, as well as the classical works of Bach, Mahler, Stravinsky and Messiaen.

Discography

Albums

Bibliography
Essays on Music and Musicians in Australia
The Art of Musical Improvisation: Thoughts and Ideas

Awards and nominations

ARIA Music Awards
The ARIA Music Awards is an annual awards ceremony that recognises excellence, innovation, and achievement across all genres of Australian music. They commenced in 1987. 

! 
|-
| 2014
| The Hunters & Pointers (with Graeme Lyall John Hoffman & Ben Robertson)
| Best Jazz Album
| 
| 
|-

Australian Classical Music Awards

! 
|-
| 2005
| Tony Gould
| Classical Music Award for "Outstanding Contribution to Australian Music in Education" 
| 
| 
|-
| 2009
| "The River Meets the Sea" by Imogen Manins, Tony Gould, David Jones from Under the Tall Trees
| Instrumental Work of the Year 
| 
| 
|-

Australian Council for Arts

! 
|-
| 2005
| Tony Gould
| Hall of Fame
| 
| 
|-

Australian Jazz Bell Awards

! 
|-
| 2011
| Tony Gould
| Hall of Fame
| 
| 
|-

Don Banks Music Award
The Don Banks Music Award was established in 1984 to publicly honour a senior artist of high distinction who has made an outstanding and sustained contribution to music in Australia. It was founded by the Australia Council in honour of Don Banks, Australian composer, performer and the first chair of its music board.

|-
| 2009
| Tony Gould
| Don Banks Music Award
| 
|-

Music Victoria Awards
The Music Victoria Awards are an annual awards night celebrating Victorian music. They commenced in 2006.

! 
|-
| Music Victoria Awards of 2016
| Monash Sessions (with Mike Nock)
| Best Jazz Album
| 
|rowspan="1"| 
|-

References

External links
Official website
Profile on Move Records

Year of birth missing (living people)
Living people
Australian jazz pianists
Australian jazz composers
Male jazz composers
Members of the Order of Australia
Male pianists
21st-century pianists
21st-century Australian male musicians
21st-century Australian musicians